Nathan Smith (January 8, 1770December 6, 1835) was a United States senator from Connecticut.

Biography
Nathan Smith was born in Woodbury, Connecticut son of Richard and Annis (Hurd) Smith; brother of Nathaniel Smith and uncle of Truman Smith. He received a modest education. He studied law with his brother and at Litchfield Law School in 1790; was admitted to the bar in 1792, and commenced the practice of his profession in New Haven. In 1808 Smith received an honorary master's from Yale. He was also an incorporator of Washington College, later known as Trinity College in Hartford, Connecticut.

Career
Smith was prosecuting attorney for New Haven County from 1817 until his death in 1835. He was also a delegate to the State constitutional convention in 1818. In 1825, he was an unsuccessful candidate for governor of Connecticut, but was appointed United States Attorney for the district of Connecticut, serving in 1828 and 1829.

Elected as a National Republican to the United States Senate, Smith served from March 4, 1833, until his death. He was 63 when he took his seat in the US Senate, one of the oldest serving members of that body and his only time in elected office.

Death
Smith died in Washington, D.C., on December 6, 1835 (age 65 years, 332 days). President Jackson and his Cabinet attended Smith's funeral in the Senate Chamber and there was also a large funeral service held in New Haven. He is interred at the Grove Street Cemetery, New Haven, Connecticut. There is a cenotaph at Congressional Cemetery, Washington, D.C.

See also
List of United States Congress members who died in office (1790–1899)

References

External links
 

1770 births
1835 deaths
People from Woodbury, Connecticut
People of colonial Connecticut
Connecticut Federalists
National Republican Party United States senators from Connecticut
United States Attorneys for the District of Connecticut
Trinity College (Connecticut)
Burials at Grove Street Cemetery